The Indian star tortoise (Geochelone elegans) is a threatened tortoise species native to India, Pakistan and Sri Lanka where it inhabits dry areas and scrub forest. It has been listed as Vulnerable on the IUCN Red List since 2016, as the population is thought to comprise more than 10,000 individuals, but with a declining trend. It is threatened by habitat loss and poaching for the illegal wildlife trade. It was upgraded to CITES Appendix I in 2019 by full consensus among all member states, giving it the highest level of international protection from commercial trade. Conservation group TRAFFIC found 6,040 were seized globally that were intended to be sold in the pet trade.

Anatomy and morphology
The carapace of G. elegans is very convex, with dorsal shields often forming humps; the lateral margins are nearly vertical; the posterior margin is somewhat expanded and strongly serrated. It has no nuchal scute, and the supracaudal is undivided, and curved inward in the male; the shields are strongly striated concentrically. The first vertebral scute is longer than broad, and the others are broader than long, with the third at least as broad as the corresponding costal. The plastron is large, truncated or openly notched in front, and deeply notched and bifid behind; the suture between the humerals is much longer than that between the femorals; the suture between the pectorals is very short; the axillary and inguinal sutures are rather small. The head is moderate in size, with the forehead swollen, convex, and covered with rather small and irregular shields; the beak is feebly hooked, bi- or tricuspid; the edges of the jaws are denticulated; the alveolar ridge of the upper jaw is strong. The outer-anterior face of the fore limbs have numerous unequal-sized, large, imbricate, bony, pointed tubercles; the heel has large, more or less spur-like tubercles; a group of large conical or subconical tubercles is found on the hinder side of the thigh. The carapace is black, with yellow areolae from which yellow streaks radiate; these streaks are usually narrow and very numerous. The plastron likewise has black and yellow, radiating streaks. The Indian star tortoise can grow to 10 inches long.

The patterning, although highly contrasting, is disruptive and breaks the outline of the tortoise as it sits in the shade of grass or vegetation. They are mostly herbivorous and feed on grasses, fallen fruit, flowers, and leaves of succulent plants, and will occasionally eat carrion. In captivity, however, they should never be fed meat.

The sexual dimorphism of adult Indian star tortoises is quite apparent. Females are considerably larger than their male counterparts. In addition, the females' plastrons are much flatter than those of the males, which have a concave shape.

The shape of this creature is presumed to be specially adapted to naturally assist it to return to a stable stance after it has been turned over. Mathematicians Gábor Domokos of the Budapest University of Technology and Economics and Péter Várkonyi of Princeton University designed a homogeneous object called a gömböc that has exactly one unstable balance point and exactly one stable balance point. Just as a bottom-weighted (nonhomogeneous weight distribution) sphere would always return to the same upright position, they found it was possible to construct a shape that behaves the same way. After that, they noted the similarity to the Indian star tortoise and subsequently tested 30 turtles by turning them upside down. They found many of them to be self-righting.

Distribution and habitat

The Indian star tortoise ranges from India (except Lower Bengal), extending west to Sindh province (Pakistan) and Sri Lanka. A large number of specimens of this species are found in the illegal wildlife trade in India. Few studies exist which have quantified wild populations and the effect of trade on them.

References

External links

Indian Star Tortoise

Geochelone
Reptiles of South Asia
Reptiles of Pakistan
Reptiles of India
Reptiles described in 1795
Reptiles of Sri Lanka
Species endangered by the pet trade
Species endangered by agricultural development
Taxa named by Johann David Schoepff
Reptiles as pets